Organised crime in Australia refers to the activities of various groups of crime families, organised crime syndicates or underworld activities including drug trafficking, contract killing, racketeering and other crimes in Australia.

European-Australian networks

The Carlton Crew

The Carlton Crew, based in Melbourne, is an Italian-Australian criminal organisation from Melbourne, Victoria. It was formed in the late 1970s and was named after the Melbourne suburb in which it is based. The organisation had a strong rivalry with the Honoured Society and the Calabrese Family, both of which were Calabrian 'Ndrangheta groups also based in Melbourne. The Carlton Crew had a strong role in the infamous Melbourne gangland killings.

The Honoured Society

The Honoured Society is a Calabrian 'Ndrangheta group based in Melbourne In 1963, it was reportedly involved in the Victoria Market Murders. It was led by gangster Frank Benvenuto until his slaying in 2000. Tony Romeo, another high-ranking member, was shot in 2002. Ndrangheta operating in Australia include the Arena, Italiano, Muratore, Benvenuto and Condello clans.

Serbian mafia

The first Serbian mafiosi came to Australia in the late '70s, organised in a Yugoslav clan, their headquarters were some 15 kafanas in Sydney, Wollongong and Melbourne. In the '80s the Serbian Mafia was reinforced with the arrival of Serbian immigrants. Milivoje Matović "Miša Kobra", arrived to Sydney in 1986 and became a known gambler who organised big games. His younger brother Braca owed money to the gang of Žorž Stanković, Žorž sent his son Batica for Miša Kobra whose friend Boža Cvetić threw down the street after he had pointed a gun at them. Batica was deported to Serbia and Braca was killed in the meantime. Žorž was killed in 1993 and his son Batica in 1996. In 2005 interviews with Australian Serbs, it was said some 20 Zemun clan members operated in Australia at the time, double the number working prior to Operation Sablja. Serbian boxer Božidar Cvetić who in 2002 was stabbed, now worked as a bouncer in Australia said that Australian police had shown him pictures of some 150 Serbian criminals active in Australia. In May 2007, Australian police saw recruitment to organised crime motorcycle gangs from young Serbs.

Albanian mafia

Godfather of an Albanian mafia family 'Daut Kadriovski' gained attention of Australian Authorities after creating a drug pipeline through Albanian and Croatian communities in Sydney and Brisbane.

North Asian networks
North Asian networks include the Russian mafia and  Yakuza.

Outlaw motorcycle gangs

Outlaw motorcycle gangs are present in Australia, with international outlaw clubs like the Bandidos, Hells Angels and Gypsy Jokers as well as other groups that are localised and less widespread. One of the major events in Australian motorcycle gang criminal history was what became known as the Milperra Massacre in 1984, where a fight between two gangs, the Comancheros and the Bandidos in Milperra in the South of Sydney, turned into a gun battle that claimed seven lives - six gang members and a civilian. While conflict between various clubs has been ever present, in 2008 the gang conflict escalated, with 13 shootings taking place in Sydney in the space of two weeks. Gang violence has become high-profile to the point where various state governments have taken steps to change laws to focus on the problem, and police have set up groups to deal with the threat, including the Crime Gang Task Force in South Australia Bikie gangs in South Australia at least, are involved in drugs, murder, extortion and other forms of intimidation and violence. Bikie gangs in South Australia have diversified their activities into both legal and illegal commercial business enterprises. In Western Australia they are involved in the drug trade Laws to deal with Bikie gangs have been introduced into Northern Territory, South Australia, and are presently being looked at in NSW and Queensland. In early 2009, Comanchero Motorcycle Club and Hells Angels were also believed to be involved in a clash at Sydney Airport. One man was beaten to death in plain view of witnesses at the airport, and police estimated as many as 15 men were involved in the violence. Police documents detail the brawl as a result of a Comanchero gang member and a Hells Angels biker being on the same flight from Melbourne. Four suspects were arrested as a result of the altercation. Including two murders in the capital city, 4 people were killed in the space of a week in Canberra and in Sydney. As a result of heightening violence, New South Wales Premier Nathan Rees announced the state police anti-gang squad would be boosted to 125 members from 50.

Clubs in Australia include:

 Bandidos - The Bandidos are one of the "Big Four" gangs identified by the FBI. They have 19 chapters across Australia and between 250 and 400 members. One of the clubs that has actively recruited from ethnic groups in recent years.
 Coffin Cheaters - They have chapters in Western Australia, Victoria, New South Wales and Queensland, as well as in Norway. They have between 200 and 300 members.
 Comanchero - One of the oldest outlaw clubs in Australia and internationally, its headquarters are in Western Sydney. They have between 300 - 350 members with chapters in NSW, SA, CAN, WA, VIC & QLD.
 Gypsy Joker - The Gypsy Joker MC, an American-formed club, are most notorious for the 2001 car-bomb murders of West Australian police senior investigator Don Hancock and Lawrence Lewis. They have between 200 and 300 members in Australia.
 Hells Angels - Founded in the US but now active worldwide. In Australia, they have 150-250 members and are allied with the Nomads.
 Nomads - The Nomads club has no website and is not as widely known as other clubs, but does have a significant presence in the press as an outlaw motorcycle club engaged in allegedly illegal activities.
 Notorious - The club Notorious, a recent ethnically Middle Eastern based gang, have started competing with existing traditionally Anglo-Celtic bikie gangs, in a turf war for drug sales. Notorious is reportedly using members of the Middle Eastern and Islander communities in Sydney, and are believed to be recruiting members of those backgrounds from other clubs. They have between 150-200 members.
 Rebels - The Rebels are the largest outlaw motorcycle club in Australia, and have 29 chapters. They are a more traditional club and are run by former boxer and founding member, Alex Vella. They are by far the largest club in Australia with around 2,000 members.

East and southeast Asian gangs
Asian gangs have some history in Australia. In the late 1980s, the Vietnamese gang 5T was active in the Cabramatta area of Sydney and believed to be involved in the murder of John Newman, the Member for Cabramatta in the NSW State Parliament. Other gangs active in Cabramatta, Sydney include the Four Aces and Madonna's Mob. Chinese gangs have existed as a low level activity for at least 20 years. Whilst media focus on Asian gangs in Australia is not as severe as it once was in the 1980s, activities across a diverse criminal portfolio continue to occur. Groups at varied states of organisation are involved in murder, violence, drug importation and distribution, money laundering, human trafficking, and coercion of women into illegal prostitution. Large importation seizures of narcotics and illicit precursors have often involved ethnically Asian syndicates. Additionally, South-East Asian groups have a significant presence in large scale hydroponic cannabis cultivation with ethnically Vietnamese individuals often being arrested during seizures.

In terms of Chinese gang activity, highly organised crime syndicates in Sydney have looked to Chinese youths on student visas for their recruitment drives. Multimillion-dollar prostitution rackets have been operating in Melbourne for several years, one of the largest by Mulgrave woman Xue Di Yan. Vietnamese syndicates have gained media attention again recently with a recent drug bust in Melbourne. Casino high roller, Thanh Hai Pham, and his wife were ring leaders of this syndicate and a total of 12 people were arrested in connection with this operation. Of a much less organised nature, has been the violence perpetrated by youths of Southeast Asian descent across Melbourne. Luke Mitchell, who in 2009 came to the aid of a stranger, was set upon and stabbed by a group of Thai nationals who have since been arrested. One of the most horrendous acts of violence in recent times has been the machete attack outside Bubble nightclub on bouncer, Ahmad Chokr, was committed by the notorious Yellow Klique gang, one of the most violent Asian gangs in the last decade. Most recently, a man was beaten in front of his family at St. Albans station by a group of youth of "Asian appearance".

In Australia, the major importer of illicit drugs in recent decades has been 'The Company', according to police sources in the region. This is a conglomerate run by triad bosses which focuses particularly on methamphetamine and cocaine. It has laundered money through junkets for high-stakes gamblers who visit Crown Casinos in Australia and Macau. 

Gangs include: Triad; 5T; Spider Boys; Sing Wah; Yee Tong,

Latin and South American cartels

The now-defunct Bogota Cartel of Colombia had operations in Australia.

The Mexican drug cartel Sinaloa Cartel has infiltrated Australia.

Street and youth gangs

Bodgies and widgies were the first of the teen gangs in Australia post WW2 - the term "bodgie" originated in the Darlinghurst area of Sydney. It was just after the end of WW2 and rationing had caused a flourishing black market in US-made cloth. People used to try and pass off inferior cloth as American-made when in fact it was not: so it was called "bodgie". The first bodgie gang was the Woolloomooloo Yanks who congregated in Cathedral Street Woolloomooloo. By 1948 about 200 bodgies were regularly frequenting Kings Cross milk bars. Soon, bodgie gangs formed at other inner-Sydney locations. After a time, moccasins and American drape suits complete with pegged trousers replaced their attire of blue jeans and leather American Airline jackets or zoot suits.

The mid 1960s saw the arrival of the "sharpie" culture. The sharpie gangs were particularly prominent in Melbourne, but were also found in Sydney and Perth to lesser extents. The focus was again on fashion with the guys wearing tight fitting jeans from Lee, Levi, Westco & Eastcoast brands, and some wearing bib and brace denim overalls. The sharpie cardigan or "connie" was an essential and expensive piece of knitwear with many sharps spending up to two weeks wages on a particular design. Shoes were also a key component of the look with sharps wearing leather platform shoes or others with Cuban heels sourced from local shoe manufacturers. The sharpie gangs were highly territorial and wild brawls were common place at dance halls or disco's when two different gangs happened to both attend. The sharpie culture went through three distinct waves of popularity from the mid 1960s through to around 1980. The sharpies were huge fans of local Aussie rock music and listened to bands such as Billy Thorpe & the Aztecs, Lobby Loyde's Coloured Balls, Buster Brown and AC/DC. The movement essentially died out as many sharps had grown up and were tired of the constant fighting with other gangs and being targeted by law enforcement - many more had drifted off to become immersed in newer and less violent influences such as punk, ska, rocksteady & reggae.

The early 1980s saw the rise of various ethnically based gangs in Sydney & Melbourne - the surge of migrants fleeing wars in the Middle East saw young males from these countries forming various street gangs including (in Melbourne), the Black Dragons, the Lebanese Tigers and the Turkish Lions.

During the early 1990s, Melbourne youth gangs included: Preston boys pmr Reservoir boys 
3174, based around Noble Park and Springvale; Keyzy/Burra boys, based in Keysborough; LSC (Lake Side Crew), Euro Boyz based in St. Albans through to Taylors Lakes; 14K, based in Footscray; BST, based in Sunshine, Deerpark & Werribee; MC3, based in Dandenong South; Oakleigh Wogs, based in Oakleigh; Springy Nips, based in Springvale; RT Criminals, based in Camberwell and Ashburton; WTP, based in Glen Iris and East Malvern; HTL, based in Kew, Hawthorn and Shepparton;

Previous gangs in Melbourne include Brothers for Life (B4L), Sunshine Boys, Young St Albans and Kings Park (YSNK), Yellow Klique (YK) the Springvale-based Springvale Boys (SB). More current gangs include Straight Sunshine (SSS), Loyalty Liberty Life Knowledge (3LK), Young Thirty Twenty (YTT), Kings Park St Albans (KPS), Richmond based gangs Hard2Kill (H2K). These gangs are seen to be predominantly of South- East Asian descent, most notably Vietnamese. This gang war has seen an increase in knife attacks amongst young Asian men as well as a rise in bottle and glass related assaults. These gangs have shown to be extremely violent even in front of police and security. Their activity has gone from assaulting one another in the streets to fire bombing of rival's houses. In 2010, a Victoria Police task force headed by Acting Detective Inspector Dave de Francesco, named Task Force Echo, was formed to counter warring gangs.

Middle Eastern gangs

Middle-Eastern gangs rose to prominence around 1995–1996 in Australia, most prominently in Sydney. By 2000, the middle Eastern gangs had gained ground in Sydney, conducting extortion against nightclubs, ram raids, and car theft. More recently, drive-by shootings have become more common, with tit for tat drive by shooting starting as early as 1998, and becoming more common in recent years. including a drive by machine gun attack on a police station in Lakemba, Sydney. In 2006, concerns over the lack of intelligence in the wake of revenge attacks, which included stabbings and assaults, by Middle Eastern youths following the Cronulla riots; led the NSW Police to set up a permanent Middle-Eastern Organised Crime squad similar in vein to the existing Asian Crime Squad.

Prominent individuals
 John Wren, controversial Melbourne businessman, who is alleged to have masterminded a large-scale SP bookmaking operation based in Melbourne in the early 1900s, and who was the model for John West, the subject of the famous Frank Hardy novel Power Without Glory.
 Abe Saffron, notorious 20th-century Sydney crime figure.
 Lenny McPherson, notorious 20th-century Sydney crime figure.
 George Freeman, notorious 20th-century Sydney crime figure.
 Percival John (Perce) Galea, notorious 20th-century Sydney crime figure.
 Robert Trimbole, Griffith-based 'Ndrangheta boss and drug trafficker.
 Terry Clark New Zealand-born drug syndicate boss ("Mr Big" of the "Mr Asia" syndicate)
 Melbourne-based drug dealers Tony Mokbel and Dennis Allen
 Chopper Read, Melbourne-based standover man and hitman.
 Kath Pettingill (born 1935), matriarch of the Melbourne-based criminal family, the Pettingill family. 
 Dennis Bruce Allen, member of the Melbourne-based criminal family, the Pettingill family.
 Victor George Peirce, member of the Melbourne-based criminal family, the Pettingill family.
 John Ibrahim, member of the Sydney-based Ibrahim criminal family.

Activities

Violence

Homicide
Examples of homicide include: Melbourne gangland killings; Sydney Airport bikie killing; John Newman.

Terrorism

Australia has known acts of modern terrorism since the 1960s, while the federal parliament, since the 1970s, has enacted legislation seeking to specifically target terrorism. In terms of the predictors of and motivations behind such activities, theories of social disorganisation and anomie describe the clear political and social focus. The Australian government's foreign affairs, defence and humanitarian policies are also pertinent to this analysis, justifying the application of cross-cultural conflict.

These include the Sydney Hilton bombing and Turkish consulate bombing, as well as the activities of militant Islamic groups such as 
Faheem Khalid; Mohammed Abderrahman (aka Willie Brigitte); Joseph T. Thomas; the Sydney Five and 2005 Sydney terrorism plot.; the Benbrika Group in Melbourne (including Abdul Nacer Benbrika); and the Holsworthy Barracks terror plot.

Arson
An example of arson is the Whiskey Au Go Go fire.

Sexual assault
An example of sexual assault is the Sydney gang rapes.

Protection rackets, extortion and coercion
Examples of protection rackets, extortion and coercion include Alphonse Gangitano.

Financial Crime

Money laundering
Money laundering may be connected with legitimate operations, and has economic impacts

Counterfeiting
In relation to counterfeiting, all State, Territory and Federal police are authorised under the Crimes (Currency) Act 1981 to seize and prosecute currency related matters, including domestic and foreign currencies. Counterfeiting can range across films, music, games and other electronic appliances, software, and fashion.

Tax Evasion
Tax Evasion may be connected with legitimate operations and has an economic impact.

Cybercrime

Copyright infringement

In the 2007 Australian federal budget, the AFP was provided with additional funding of $8.3m over two years to strengthen its capability to pursue serious and complex IP crime, particularly where organised or transnational criminal elements are involved (AGD 2007). AFACT has reported that links between organised crime and film piracy were first uncovered following a raid on Malaysia-linked pirates in Sydney in 2002. The Australian Subscription Television and Radio Association (ASTRA) referred to several cases involving pirates who were involved in other criminal activity such as prostitution and drugs possession. Status Investigations and Security Pty Ltd referred to a matter that indicated organised links between copyright offences and importation of prohibited weapons. Trademark Investigation Services (TMIS) argued that 'Recent Police cases suggest such links'. They pointed out that 'To examine high quality goods and packaging it is obvious that a single person could not set up the productions, packaging, export, import, wholesale, etc. alone. There is a network or chain where each party along the way is a part of the ongoing conspiracy to manufacture, package and sell the goods for profits they could not otherwise make from those goods if they were plain, unbranded goods.'

Cyberwarfare

The most common form of cyberwarfare perpetrated by online criminal organisations is the Denial-of-service attack. Hacking, denial of service, access to and leaking of government (e.g. military) documentation have all been highlighted as key concerns for Australia.

White-collar crime and corruption

Public sector (political corruption)

 Royal Commission on the activities of the Federated Ship Painters and Dockers Union ("Costigan Royal Commission") (1980–1984), investigated organised crime influences and drug trafficking in a large trade union;
 Royal Commission of Inquiry into Drug Trafficking ("Stewart Royal Commission"), (1981–1983);
 Royal Commission into Drug Trafficking ("Woodward Royal Commission"), (1977–1980) investigated drug trafficking in New South Wales, especially links between the Mafia and New South Wales Police and the disappearance of Donald Mackay;
 Royal Commission into the Building and Construction Industry ("Cole Royal Commission"), (2001–2003), investigated the conduct of industrial relations within the building industry;
 Inquiry into certain Australian companies in relation to the UN Oil-For-Food Programme ("Cole Inquiry"), (2005–2006), investigation into the alleged participation of the AWB into the Oil for Food program;
 Royal Commission into Commercial Activities of Government and Other Matters ("WA Inc Royal Commission") (1990–1992) investigated the collapse of Bond Corporation, Rothwells, Bell Group, and other large businesses in Western Australia as well as government commercial enterprises.

Private sector (corporate crime)

 The Cole Commission;
 Royal Commission into HIH Insurance (2001–2003), investigated the collapse of HIH Insurance, then Australia's second largest insurance company;
 Royal Commission of Inquiry in respect of certain matters relating to allegations of organised crime in clubs ("Moffitt Royal Commission") (1973–74) investigated organised crime in New South Wales.

Drug trafficking

Clandestine chemistry

Criminal organisations may generate significant income through the manufacture and trafficking of illicit drugs and their precursor chemicals. Increased involvement has resulted in larger and more sophisticated clandestine laboratories being detected in Australia. In 2008–09, a record 449 clandestine laboratories were detected in Australia (a 26 per cent increase from 2007–08). 
67.7 per cent of clandestine laboratories continue to be detected in residential locations. Over two tonnes of precursor chemicals for the production of meth/amphetamines were detected at the Australian border in 2008–09, nearly double the weight detected in 2007–08. In 2008–09, clandestine laboratory detections increased across most jurisdictions, the largest occurring in Western Australia, which increased from 30 laboratories in 2007–08 to 78 in 2008–09, an increase of 160 per cent. In the context of the Australian Illicit Drug Report, a clandestine laboratory is any concealed place where chemicals are used to produce illicit drugs. Such laboratories range from crude, makeshift operations using simple processes to highly sophisticated operations using technically advanced facilities. They can be located virtually anywhere—in private residences, motel and hotel rooms, apartments, horse trailers, houseboats, boats, vehicles, buses, trucks, campgrounds and commercial establishments—and are usually very portable. Some clandestine laboratories use very simple processes such as extracting cannabis oil from plants using solvents; others use complex processes involving a number of chemicals and a range of equipment to manufacture drugs such as methylamphetamine and ecstasy. Clan labs are usually discovered after they have exploded.

Mainly clan labs manufacture methylamphetamine but other drugs produced in Australia and reported on in connection with clandestine laboratories are ecstasy, methcathinone, cannabis oil, 'crack' cocaine, pethidine and gamma-hydroxybutyrate (GHB, or fantasy). Because of the increase in the number of clandestine laboratories detected in Australia, it was determined that there was a need for better exchange of information between the various jurisdictions. As a result, in August 1997 the first Chemical Diversion Conference was held at the Australian Bureau of Criminal Intelligence; among other things, a categorisation of the various types of clandestine laboratories was developed. Initially there were three categories but a fourth has since been added. The categories are as follows:
 Category A—active (chemicals and equipment in use);
 Category B—stored/used (equipment or chemicals);
 Category C—stored/unused (equipment or chemicals);
 Category D—used site/evidence or admissions of a prior laboratory (ABCI 1998).

Clan lab activity may include but are not limited to strong unusual odours, traffic at extremely late hours, covered windows and reinforced doors, exhaust fans and pipes on windows, high security measures such as bars on windows and an accumulation of chemical containers and waste. On 13 April 2011 the Minister for Home Affairs and Justice launched the Clandestine Drug Laboratory Remediation Guidelines. These Guidelines provide a framework for regulatory authorities and environmental specialists to investigate and remediate sites that may have been contaminated due to being used as clandestine drug laboratories. Clan labs produce substances that are toxic, corrosive, explosive and carcinogenic. They can pose a significant threat to the health and safety of officers, the general public and the environment and hazards include:
 flammable and/or explosive atmosphere;
 acutely toxic atmospheres;
 leaking or damaged compressed gas cylinders;
 clan labs located in confined spaces;
 water reactive and spontaneous explosive chemicals;
 damaged and leaking chemical containers;
 electrical hazards and sources of ignition;
 reactions – in progress, hot, under pressure;
 incompatible chemical reactions; and,
 bombs and booby traps.

Clan labs in Perth
The Police Commissioner (Karl O’Callaghan's) son was involved in a clan lab explosion in March were a total of 5 people were injured. On 2 June a Gosnells house explodes, resulting in one man in hospital with severe burns. In 2010, 133 clan labs were dismantled. Of the clan labs discovered in 2010, 26 were in the cities of Armadale and Gosnells and the Shire of Serpentine-Jarrahdale. In Western Australia, Gosnells has proved to be the hotspot for drug manufacture, with six clan labs uncovered by police. Five labs were shut down in Armadale. Almost all drug labs were found to manufacture methylamphetamine. The suburbs of Kelmscott, Huntingdale, Bedfordale and Southern River harboured two clan labs each until these were uncovered and shut down by officers.
Clan labs have also been detected in Camillo, Maddington, Thornlie, Mundijong, Byford, Brookdale and Karrakup.

Heroin

 Source countries / production: "three major regions known as the golden triangle (Burma, Laos, Thailand), golden crescent (Afghanistan) and Central and South America. The majority of heroin imported into Australia comes from Burma. However there are suggestions that due to the continuing decline in opium production in South East Asia, traffickers may begin to look to Afghanistan as a source of heroin."
 Community impact: "In 2004, 384,800 people aged 14 years and over reported having used heroin, methadone and/or other opioids in their lifetime, with 56,300 using in the previous 12 months."

Cocaine

 Source countries / production: "Coca leaf is only grown in three countries for commercial distribution. These countries are Bolivia, Colombia and Peru. Therefore there is no local production of cocaine in Australia. "
 Community impact: "In a 2004 survey, one percent of people aged 14 years and over indicated they had used cocaine in the previous 12 months."

Meth/amphetamines (including MDMA)

 Source countries / production: "the majority of amphetamines consumed in Australia is produced in this country in clandestine laboratories."
 Community impact: "more than 9% of Australians aged 14 and over indicated they had used amphetamines at some stage in their lifetime and 3% had used amphetamines in the past 12 months. According to the Australian Crime Commission, there is an increase in the number of young recreational drug users smoking crystal methamphetamine. Research also indicated an increase in use of methamphetamine, which occurred around the same time as the heroin shortage in Australia in 2000-01."

LSD, psilocybin, and other hallucinogens

 Source countries / production: "LSD is not generally produced in Australia and is mainly imported from the United States of America. There are 30 types of hallucinogenic mushrooms growing naturally in this country and there have been seizures of spores from other countries."
 Community impact: "1.2 million people aged 14 years and over indicated they had used hallucinogens in their lifetime, with 116,400 using hallucinogens in the preceding 12 months."

Cannabis

 Source countries / production: "Cannabis is produced in most areas of Australia with a trend in recent years towards the use of hydroponics. It is now suspected that hydroponics is the most common method of cultivation in the domestic market. Growers believe that hydroponics produce a better yield, reduce the chances of detection and mitigate seasonal climate changes. There is a level of cannabis importation from countries including the Netherlands and United Kingdom.

Organised crime groups, including outlaw motorcycle gangs are involved in the cultivation and distribution of cannabis within Australia. According to the Australian Crime Commission, there has been a noticeable increase in the involvement of Vietnamese crime groups in recent years." 
 Community impact: "Cannabis is the most widely used illicit drug in Australia and generally easily available. In a 2004 survey, it was reported that one in three Australians aged 14 years and over had used cannabis at least once in their life, with more than half a million indicating use in the last 12 months."

Human trafficking

Sex trafficking

Sex trafficking involves Asian syndicates and European syndicates. It places burdens on the Australian health system.

Illegal immigration (migrant trafficking)
 19 different offences of money laundering available under the Criminal Code, and these can be classified into two types: those linked to the proceeds of crime (funds generated by an illegal activity) and those linked to the instruments of crime (funds used to conduct an illegal activity). Possessing the proceeds or instruments of crime is a single offence under the Criminal Code. Persons receiving, possessing, concealing, importing into Australia, exporting from Australia, or disposing of the proceeds of crime may be guilty of this offence. Possessing the proceeds of crime attracts a maximum custodial sentence of two years.

The remaining 18 offences of money laundering are those of dealing with the proceeds or instruments of crime. 'Dealing with' the proceeds of crime includes all the actions considered as possession of the proceeds of crime as well as engaging in banking transactions using the illicit funds. These 18 offences are distinguished by the value of the property involved and the intent of the offender. The punishments' severity increases with the value and with the offender's knowledge of the source of the funds. The Criminal Code classifies offences according to the value of the funds involved into bands of $1,000,000 or more; $100,000 to $999,999; $50,000 to $99,999; $10,000 to $49,999; $1,000 to $9,999; and funds of any value.

 Anti-Terrorism Act 2005 - Schedule 1—Amendments to terrorism offences
  Measures to Combat Serious and Organised Crime Act 2001
 National Crime Authority Act 1984 now Australian Crime Commission Establishment Act 2002
 Crimes Legislation Amendment (Serious and Organised Crime) Bill 2009
 Australian Security Intelligence Organisation Act 1979 (ASIO Act)
 Telecommunications (Interception and Access) Act 1979
 Intelligence Services Act 2001
 Inspector-General of Intelligence and Security Act 1986
 South Australia v Totani (2010) HCA 39
 Project Stop
 Organised Crime in Australia Report, ACC 2011
 Inquiry into the Crimes Legislation Amendment (Serious and Organised Crime) Bill 2009 (PFA, 2009)
 A Collaborative Approach to Fighting Serious Organised Crime in Australia, 2009
 Submission to Parliamentary Joint Committee, Inquiry into The future impact of serious and organised crime on Australian society, ACC 2007

State

South Australia
 Statutes Amendment (Anti-Fortification) Act 2003
 Statutes Amendment (Liquor, Gambling and Security Industries) Act 2005
 Statutes Amendment (Power to Bar) Act 2008
 Serious and Organised Crime (Control) Act 2008
 Criminal Law Consolidation Act 1935

New South Wales
 Crimes (Criminal Organisations Control) Act 2009
 Crimes Amendment (Fraud, Identity and Forgery Offences) Act 2009 (NSW)
 NSW Police: Asian Crime Squad; Drug Squad; Firearms & Organised Crime Squad; Gangs Squad; Middle Eastern Organised Crime Squad; Organised Crime (Targeting) Squad
 Drug Misuse and Trafficking Act 1985 (NSW)
Section 24A states that: (1) A person who has possession of: (a) a precursor, or (b) a drug manufacture apparatus, intended by the person for use in the manufacture or production, by that person or another person, of a prohibited drug is guilty of an offence. A common example of this offence includes being in possession of the chemicals and ingredients required to manufacture a drug.

Offences including possession of precursors and certain apparatus for manufacture or production of prohibited drugs fall under Part 2, Division 2 of the Drug Misuse and Trafficking Act 1985 (NSW). This means that these offences are considered indictable offences, and are heard in the District or Supreme Court. Defences to this offence include but are not limited to duress and necessity. Also, those licensed or authorised under the Poisons and Therapeutic Goods Act 1966 or somebody given authority by the Director General of the Department of Health are exempt from liability. Section 35A of the Drug Misuse and Trafficking Act 1985 (NSW) outlines a further defence: it is legal to possess or manufacture a prohibited substance if the substance is contained in a product where the substance cannot be readily extracted, or in a product not for human consumption, or if the substance is possessed for the purpose of its disposal as waste or its destruction. The maximum penalty for this offence is a fine of $220,000, 10 years imprisonment or both.

Western Australia
 Criminal Code Act Compilation Act 1913
 Misuse of Drugs Act 1981
 Firearms Act 1973
 Corruption and Crime Commission Act 2003
 Proposed Anti-Association Laws and other Measures
 Criminal Code Amendment (Identity Crime) Bill 2009
 Prohibited Behaviour Orders Regulations 2011
 Telecommunications (Interception) Western Australia Act 1996
 Director of Public Prosecutions (Cth) v Kamal [2011] WASCA 55
 R v Quaid [2009] WASC 202
 Nguyen v State of Western Australia [2009] WASCA 81
 [WA Police]: Serious and Organised Crime Division which includes the Gang Crime Squad; Drug and Firearm Squad; Financial Crime Squad and Proceeds of Crime Squad

Queensland
 Criminal Code Act 1899
 Criminal Proceeds Confiscation Act 2002
 Police Powers and Responsibilities Act 2000
 Vicious Lawless Association Disestablishment Act 2013
 Tattoo Parlours Act 2013
 Criminal Law (Criminal Organisations Disruption) Amendment Act 2013

Victoria
Criminal Organisations Control Act 2012 (Vic)
 Crimes (Assumed Identities) Act 2004
 Crimes (Controlled Operations) Act 2004
 Evidence (Witness Identity Protection) Act 2004
 Major Crimes (Investigative Powers) Act 2004
 Surveillance Devices (Amendment) Act 2004
 Mokbel v R [2011] VSCA 106
 Major Crime (Investigative Powers) Act 2004 (No 9), Re [2007] VSC 128
 Poynder v Kent; Sodomacco v O'Bryan [2008] VSCA 245

Tasmania
 Police Offences Amendment Act 2007

Northern Territory
 Justice Legislation (Group Criminal Activities) Act 2006
 Serious Crime Control Act 2009

Australian Capital Territory
 Crimes (Controlled Operations) Act 2008
 Crimes (Assumed Identities) Act 2009

International and other jurisdictions
Convention against Transnational Organized Crime (the 'Palermo Convention') including the Protocol to Prevent, Suppress and Punish Trafficking in Persons, especially Women and Children and Protocol against the Smuggling of Migrants by Land, Sea and Air - 2000 (UN)
 Article 5 – Criminalization of participation in an organized criminal group.
 6 – Criminalization of the laundering of proceeds of crime;
 8 – Criminalization of corruption;
 23 – Criminalization of obstruction of justice;
 3 and 5 of the Protocol on Trafficking in Persons; and,
 3, 5 and 6 of the Protocol Against Smuggling of Migrants

Organized Crime Control Act - 1970 (US)

Title 21 of the United States Code - 1970 (US) Ch. 12 Sub. 1 and 2, particularly § 848. Continuing criminal enterprise
See Continuing Criminal Enterprise

Racketeer Influenced and Corrupt Organizations Act (the 'RICO Act') - 1970 (US)
 Offences: § 1962. Prohibited activities
 Penalties: § 1963. Criminal penalties

Serious Organised Crime and Police Act 2005 - (UK)

Criminal Code (Canada), RSC 1985, c C-46.

Media representation and references in popular culture

TV drama
The topic has been widely covered in books and the news media and has also been the subject of several major Australian films and TV drama series including the ABC-TV series Phoenix, Janus and Blue Murder and, more recently, the popular Nine Network miniseries Underbelly.

News media
 Counterfeit Drugs | Hungry Beast, ABC
 MDMA | Hungry Beast, ABC
 Cops Against Drug Laws | Hungry Beast, ABC
 The Gang of 49 | Hungry Beast, ABC
 Crime Incorporated | Four Corners, ABC
 Paul Wilson, Professor of Criminology on Unconstitutional Anti-Association Bikie Laws | ABC
 Mr Sin, The Abe Saffron Story | ABC
 Man charged and 11kg ICE seized in joint operation | NSW Police
 Police dismantle drug importation syndicate | NSW Police
 Police smash interstate heroin ring | NSW Police
 Underbelly | Nine Australia
 Middle Eastern Organised Crime Squad Modified Car Crackdown hoons | 7 Network
 Ride of Defiance | Ten News
 Lawler, J. (2010) The Fifth Estate Goes Virtual
 Rise of Middle Eastern Crime in Australia 
 "History of Gangs in Australia". ABC, Late night live.

Print media
 Butler, Mark "Neighbours fear gang violence will spiral into gun battles as secret police report exposes fears of open warfare"
 Silvest, John "Outlaw gangs make killing" The Age, 24 September 2006
Guide to Sydney Crime

See also
 Gangs in Australia
 List of criminal enterprises, gangs, and syndicates

References